Moataz Al-Mousa ((born 7 August 1987) is a retired Saudi professional footballer who last played for Al-Wehda. He has played in one World Cup 2010 qualifying match for Saudi Arabia.

Career
Al-Musa helped Al-Ahli in obtaining Saudi Federation Cup and the Saudi Crown Prince Cup in 2007. He also achieved his team Gulf Cup for clubs in front of Al-Nasr in Saudi Arabia 2008. he also achieved the King Cup of Champions in 2011 and 2012.

Brothers
Moataz Al-Musa has two elder brothers, Kamel from Al-Ahli and Ahmed who plays Al-Wehda Club.

Honours

Al-Ahli
Crown Prince Cup: 2007
Gulf Club Champions Cup: 2008
Saudi Champions Cup: 2011, 2012

References

1987 births
Living people
Saudi Arabian footballers
Saudi Arabia international footballers
2011 AFC Asian Cup players
Al-Ahli Saudi FC players
Najran SC players
Al-Wehda Club (Mecca) players
Al-Wadi FC players
Saudi Professional League players
Saudi Fourth Division players
Sportspeople from Mecca
Association football midfielders